{{DISPLAYTITLE:C13H13N3O3}}
The molecular formula C13H13N3O3 (molar mass: 259.27 g/mol, exact mass: 259.0957 u) may refer to:

 Ciclobendazole
 Lenalidomide